The Electoral (Amendment) Act 1959 (No. 33) was a law in Ireland which sought to revise Dáil constituencies. It was found to be repugnant to the Constitution and never came into effect.

It was challenged by John O'Donovan, a Fine Gael senator and former TD. In O'Donovan v. Attorney-General (1961), the High Court held that the Act was unconstitutional and suggested that the ratio of representation to population across constituencies should differ by no more than 5%. The court, interpreting the "so far as it is practicable" condition of the Constitution, suggested a 5% variation as the limit without exceptional circumstances.

It was formally repealed by the Electoral (Amendment) Act 1961.

See also
Elections in the Republic of Ireland

References

Electoral 1959
1959 in Irish law
Acts of the Oireachtas of the 1950s